Vadim Gennadyevich Pomazov (born 5 July 1968 in Yaroslavl) is a former Russian football player.

References

1968 births
Footballers from Yaroslavl
Living people
Soviet footballers
FC Spartak Kostroma players
FC Dynamo Moscow reserves players
FC Shinnik Yaroslavl players
Russian footballers
Russian Premier League players
FC Yugra Nizhnevartovsk players

Association football midfielders